Mismaloya comes from Nahuatl: [michmaloyan] "place where they grab fish with their hands" is a small village, located on the coast of the Bahía de Banderas in the Mexican state of Jalisco [Xalixco] "on the surface of the sand". Mismaloya lies on Highway 200, south of Puerto Vallarta.

Climate

Mismaloya has a tropical wet and dry climate (Köppen Aw) featuring stable, warm temperatures all year round, with two distinct seasons, a dry season from November through May, and a wet season from June through October. UV radiation levels are high all year round, ranging from 7 January and December to 11+ between April and September. Heat and Humidity is high from December to April and it can reach extreme levels between July and August.

Film location

Mismaloya is most famous as the site where the 1963 film The Night of the Iguana was filmed. The set and crew quarters rise up the hill on the south side of the Mismaloya cove. The set is only ruins now, and the once-famous John Huston Cafe is an empty shell on top of the hill.  Huston once wrote that he was the only person who cared for the place. The movie made Puerto Vallarta famous, but the set has been forgotten.  On the other side of Highway 200 from Playa Mismaloya is El Eden, a jungle setting where parts of the movie Predator were filmed.

Tourism
The beach at Playa Mismaloya is located in a lovely cove, with a full view of Los Arcos sea rocks - a great place to snorkel and scuba dive. There are boats which tourists can rent, and the beach is home to several restaurants and trinket peddlers, as well as the Hotel Barceló, a beautiful Zoo and La Jolla De Mismaloya Condominiums, also you can reach Vallarta Botanical Gardens by 15 minutes bus ride.

References

External links

 Mismaloya Area Information
marinamismaloya.com

Populated places in Jalisco
Puerto Vallarta